Me is the debut album by London-based band Buck Brothers, released in the United Kingdom in March 2007 and the United States in October 2007. On 5 March 2007, to commemorate the album's UK release, the band broke the Guinness World Record for the "most gigs performed in 12 hours".

In October 2007 the album entered the CMJ Top 200 chart in the United States.

Track listing 
 "Run, Run, Run"
 "Gorgeously Stupid"
 "Which Me Do You Like?"
 "Mannish Girl"
 "Liar"
 "Together We Fall"
 "Girls, Skirts, Boots, Bikes"
 "One Day I'll Say It"
 "Yes, No, Stay, Go, Do, Don't, Will, Won't"
 "Gatu Politik"
 "Wake Up Call"
 "She's Red"

Notes

References 

 Feature in London Lite newspaper, March 6, 2007
 Gigwise http://www.gigwise.com/news/28863/london-band-beats-gig-world-record
 Cargo Records signing

External links 
 Official site

2007 albums